Alice Hart-Davis (born 1963) is a British journalist, author and founder of thetweakmentsguide.com.

Early life
Born in Builth Wells, the daughter of the biographer and journalist Duff Hart-Davis, and a granddaughter of publisher and biographer Rupert Hart-Davis, Alice Hart-Davis was brought up in Henley-on-Thames and educated at Headington School before reading history at St Edmund Hall, Oxford. She is also a niece of the broadcaster Adam Hart-Davis.

Career
After Oxford, Alice worked at The Sunday Telegraphs Sunday Magazine, The Daily Telegraph, the Mail on Sunday and the London Evening Standard, and now contributes as a freelance basis to many newspapers and magazines, specialising in cosmetic procedures, beauty and health. She has written many articles about anti-aging treatments and has frankly documented her own experiences in trying non-surgical cosmetic procedures such as Botox. She has also written extensively about skincare.

Hart-Davis has won several awards, including the CEW (UK) Achiever Award in 2012, P&G beauty: Best Beauty Journalist of a monthly consumer glossy in 2010, and the Johnson & Johnson Beauty Journalist of the Year, 2008. Hart-Davis is herself on the judging panel for several beauty industry awards (British Hairdresser of the Year, British Spa & Beauty Awards and the Smile (Dentistry) Awards).

She has also written guides to beauty for teenagers with both of her daughters. The first, co-authored with Molly Hindhaugh, is entitled Be Beautiful: Every Girl's Guide to Hair, Skin and Make-up (Walker Books 2009;) and the second, with Beth Hindhaugh, 100 Ways for Every Girl to Look and Feel Fantastic (Walker Books 2012;). In 2019, she published the book The Tweakments Guide: Fresher Face (Silverwood Books 2019;) a guide to non-surgical cosmetic procedures and launched an accompanying website thetweakmentsguide.com.

She lives in Bayswater, London, is married and has three children.

References

External links 
 Alice Hart-Davis website and blog
 Be Beautiful: Every Girl's Guide to Hair, Skin and Make-up
 100 Ways for Every Girl to Look and Feel Fantastic
 Good Things Skincare 

English women journalists
Living people
People educated at Headington School
1963 births
Alumni of St Edmund Hall, Oxford
People from Builth Wells
English women non-fiction writers